Swedavia AB is a Swedish state-owned company, which owns and operates ten of Sweden's busiest airports. It has its head office at the air traffic control tower of Stockholm-Arlanda Airport in Sigtuna Municipality near Stockholm.

It was formed on 1 April 2010, when the Swedish Civil Aviation Administration was split up, and all commercial airport operation was transferred to Swedavia. Air navigation services continue as a state enterprise under the name LFV (Civil Aviation Administration). In 2010, the number of employees was about 2,600.

Airports 

When the decision was made to form Swedavia, there were 16 nationally owned airports, but it was a part of the decision to transfer six of them to local owners and keep ten large airports. 
Region Värmland took over the operations of Karlstad Airport in 2010. In 2011, the operations for Ängelholm-Helsingborg Airport was transferred to Region Skåne Nordväst and Örnsköldsvik Airport was transferred to Örnsköldsvik Municipality. In 2013 Sundsvall Airport was transferred to local owners. Jönköping Airport and Skellefteå Airport were transferred to local ownership 2009/2010 before Swedavia was formed.

Key figures

References

External links

Airports in Sweden
Government-owned companies of Sweden
Swedish companies established in 2010
2010 in transport
Transport companies established in 2010
Companies based in Stockholm County
Transport operators of Sweden
Airport operators
Sigtuna Municipality